Alexander Porter (June 24, 1785January 13, 1844) was an attorney, politician, and planter, who served as United States Senator from Louisiana from 1833 to 1837. Born in Ireland, he emigrated in 1801 at the age of 16 to the United States. He served a term in the statehouse from 1816 to 1818, and as a state Supreme Court justice from 1821 to 1833.

Biography

Early life
Born in County Donegal, Ireland, Alexander Porter immigrated to the U.S. in 1801 with an uncle, who settled in Nashville, Tennessee. He received a limited schooling, but attended the now-defunct Clemenceau College. He "read the law" as an apprentice and was admitted to the bar in 1807.

Career
In 1807, he commenced practice in Attakapas Parish, Territory of Orleans. (In 1811, the area around Franklin, Louisiana, became St. Mary Parish.) Porter was a delegate to the convention which framed the first Constitution of Louisiana in 1812. He was elected as a member of the lower branch of the Louisiana Legislature from 1816 to 1818.

Alexander Porter served as a Louisiana Supreme Court justice from 1821 to 1833. In 1833, he was selected as a Whig to the United States Senate by the state legislature, to fill the vacancy caused by the death of Josiah S. Johnston. Porter served from December 19, 1833, until January 5, 1837, when he resigned due to ill health.

Porter returned to St. Mary Parish to practice law and manage his plantation, Oaklawn. He was again chosen by the legislature for the U.S. Senate, for the term beginning March 4, 1843; but he did not take his seat due to poor health. The legislature elected Henry Johnson, former governor of the state, to replace him.

Alexander Porter died in 1844. His remains were interred in Nashville City Cemetery, the location of the grave of his young wife, Evilina (Baker) Porter (1797-1819).

See also
 List of United States senators born outside the United States

Sources

External links

 

1785 births
1844 deaths
Politicians from County Donegal
Louisiana state court judges
Members of the Louisiana House of Representatives
United States senators from Louisiana
Justices of the Louisiana Supreme Court
Louisiana lawyers
Farmers from Louisiana
Irish emigrants to the United States (before 1923)
American planters
Louisiana Whigs
19th-century American politicians
Louisiana National Republicans
Whig Party United States senators
National Republican Party United States senators
U.S. state supreme court judges admitted to the practice of law by reading law
19th-century American judges
19th-century American lawyers